Serling may refer to:
Rod Serling, American screenwriter
Robert J. Serling, American novelist
Craig E. Serling, American filmmaker
Serling, the Hungarian name for Măgurele village, Mărișelu Commune, Bistrița-Năsăud County, Romania
Serling Lake, an alternative name for Siling Lake, Tibet